The municipality of Münchhausen is found  north of Marburg on the northern edge of Marburg-Biedenkopf district. It has 3,286 inhabitants (2020) and has had its current boundaries since 1974. The municipality's area is roughly 41 km².

Geography

Location
West of the community lies the Rothaargebirge, a low mountain range. The municipal area is bounded on the east by the Burgwald, another low mountain range. The constituent communities of Münchhausen and Simtshausen lie in the Wetschaft valley. Wollmar lies on the like-named river Wollmar, which empties into the Wetschaft in Münchhausen. Through the constituent communities of Oberasphe and Niederasphe flows the river Asphe.

Neighbouring communities
Münchhausen's neighbours are Burgwald, Rosenthal, Wetter, Biedenkopf and Battenberg.

Constituent communities
Münchhausen (1285 inhabitants)  (as of January 2004)
Niederasphe (914 inhabitants)
Oberasphe (356 inhabitants)
Simtshausen (495 inhabitants)
Wollmar (701 inhabitants)

History
Münchhausen am Christenberg officially came into being on 1 July 1974 when the formerly independent places of Münchhausen, Simtshausen, Niederasphe, Oberasphe and Wollmar were united.

Politics

Municipal representation

Results of municipal election on 26 March 2006:
CDU 11
SPD 10
Independent Green List (UGL) 2

Coat of arms
The civic coat of arms might be described thus: Party per chevron; above in gules a cross argent fused with the chevron; below in argent, a five-spoked wheel sable.

The coat of arms symbolizes the nearby mountain, the Christenberg, with its mediaeval church. The wheel with its five spokes stands for Münchhausen's five constituent communities.

Personalities
Euricius Cordus, German humanist

References

External links

Münchhausen's official website
Geology of the Greater Community of Münchhausen

Marburg-Biedenkopf